Nationality words link to articles with information on the nation's poetry or literature (for instance, Irish or France).

Events
 August 18 - English poet and artist William Blake marries Catherine Boucher at St Mary's Church, Battersea. In the same year, he meets his future patron, John Flaxman.

Works published

United Kingdom
William Cowper
The Diverting History of John Gilpin, published anonymously in the Public Advertiser on November 14 (published with The Task 1785)
Verses Supposed to be Written by Alexander Selkirk
Poems (see also Poems 1815)
 John Freeth, Modern Songs, on Various Subjects
 William Hayley, An Essay on Epic Poetry in Five Epistles to Mason
 William Mason:
An Archaeological Epistle to Jeremiah Milles ... Editor of a Superb Edition of the Poems of Thomas Rowley, attributed to Mason; written in the Rowleian dialect (see Thomas Chatterton's Poems, Supposed to Have Been Written ... by Thomas Rowley 1777)
King Stephen's Watch
 Hannah More, Sacred Dramas, Chiefly intended for Young Persons, published anonymously, went through 24 editions by 1829
 Edward Rushton, The Dismember'd Empire, published anonymously; attribution uncertain
 John Scott, The Poetical Works of John Scott
 John Walters, Translated Specimens of Welsh Poetry
 Joseph Warton, Essay on the Genius and Writings of Pope, Volume 2 (Volume 1 published in 1756), criticism
 Helen Maria Williams, Edwin and Eltruda
 John Wolcot writing under the pen name "Peter Pindar", Lyric Odes, to the Royal Academicians (see also More Lyric Odes 1783)

Other
 Jacques Delille, Les Jardins ("The Gardens"), France
 John Trumbull, M'Fingal: A Modern Epic Poem in Four Cantos, a satirical poem about American Tories during the American Revolution, is published in completed form (first two cantos published in 1778), United States
 Johann Wolfgang von Goethe, Die Fischerin (Singspiel, including "Der Erlkönig"), Germany

Births
Death years link to the corresponding "[year] in poetry" article:
 January 30 - Ann Taylor (died 1866), English poet and literary critic
 September 19 - Richard Lower (died 1865), English dialect poet
 Irayimman Thampi (died 1856), Indian Carnatic music composer and poet

Deaths
Birth years link to the corresponding "[year] in poetry" article:
 April 12 - Metastasio (born 1698), Italian poet and librettist
 August 27 - Henriette Louise von Hayn (born 1724), German hymn writer

See also

 List of years in poetry
 List of years in literature
 18th century in poetry
 18th century in literature
 French literature of the 18th century
 Sturm und Drang (the conventional translation is "Storm and Stress"; a more literal translation, however, might be "storm and urge", "storm and longing", "storm and drive" or "storm and impulse"), a movement in German literature (including poetry) and music from the late 1760s through the early 1780s
 List of years in poetry
 Poetry

Notes

18th-century poetry
Poetry